Xanthoperla is a genus of stoneflies in the family Chloroperlidae.

Species
Species within this genus include:
Xanthoperla acuta  Zwick, 1980 
Xanthoperla apicalis  (Newman, 1836) 
Xanthoperla curta  (McLachlan, 1875) 
Xanthoperla gissarica  Zhiltzova & Zwick, 1971 
Xanthoperla kishanganga  (Aubert, 1959) 
Xanthoperla yerkoyi  Kazanci, 1983

References

Chloroperlidae
Plecoptera genera